Matthew or Matt Jones may refer to:

Music
Matthew Jones (activist) (1936–2011), African-American folk singer/songwriter
Matthew Jones (musician) (born 1974), British violist, violinist and composer
Matthew Perryman Jones (born 1973), American singer-songwriter
Matt Jones, past member of the band Ultrasound

Sports

Association football
Matt Jones (footballer, born 1970), English footballer formerly of Southend United
Matt Jones (footballer, born 1980), Welsh international football player and manager
Matthew Jones (footballer, born 1980), English football player for Shrewsbury Town
Matt Jones (footballer, born 1986),  English football goalkeeper for Belenenses
Matty Jones (born 1995), English football player for Swindon Town

Other sports
Matt Jones (basketball) (born 1994), American basketball player
Matt Jones (Australian footballer) (born 1987), Australian rules footballer
Matt Jones (golfer) (born 1980), Australian professional golfer
Matt Jones (ice hockey) (born 1983), American ice hockey defenseman
Matt Jones (rugby union) (born 1984), Welsh international rugby union player
Matt Jones (wide receiver) (born 1983), American football wide receiver
Matt Jones (running back) (born 1993), American football running back

Other
Matt Jones (interaction designer) (born 1968), active researcher and organizer of scientific conferences
Matt Jones (writer) (born 1968), British television writer and television producer
Matt Jones (radio host) (born 1978), host and founder of Kentucky Sports Radio
Matt Jones (actor) (born 1981), American actor and comedian
Matthew F. Jones, American novelist
Matt Jones (American politician), American politician from Colorado
Matt Jones (Canadian politician), member of the Alberta Legislature
Matthew Jones (historian), London School of Economics